In the Lutheran Church, Confession (also called Holy Absolution) is the method given by Christ to the Church by which individual men and women may receive the forgiveness of sins; according to the Large Catechism, the "third sacrament" of Holy Absolution is properly viewed as an extension of Holy Baptism.

Beliefs
The Lutheran Church practices "Confession and Absolution" [referred to as the Office of the Keys] with the emphasis on the absolution, which is God's word of forgiveness. Indeed, Lutherans highly regard Holy Absolution. Confession and absolution is done in private to the pastor, called the "confessor" with the person confessing known as the "penitent". In confession, the penitent makes an act of contrition, as the pastor, acting in persona Christi, announces the formula of absolution. Prior to the confession, the penitent is to review the Ten Commandments to examine his or her conscience. In the Lutheran Church, like the Roman Catholic Church, the pastor is bound by the Seal of the Confessional. Luther's Small Catechism says "the pastor is pledged not to tell anyone else of sins to him in private confession, for those sins have been removed." If the Seal is broken, it will result in excommunication. In the nineteenth and twentieth centuries, weekly private confession became less expected; at the present time, it is, for example, expected before partaking of the Eucharist for the first time. It is also encouraged to be done frequently in a year (specifically before Easter). In many churches, times are set for the pastor to hear confessions.

In line with Luther's initial statement in his Large Catechism, some Lutherans speak of only two sacraments, Baptism and the Eucharist, although later in the same work he calls Confession and Absolution "the third sacrament." The definition of sacrament in the Apology of the Augsburg Confession lists Absolution as one of them. Luther went to confession all his life. Although Lutherans do not consider the other four rites as sacraments, they are still retained and used in the Lutheran church. Philipp Melanchthon speaking about the Confession in the Lutheran Church, claims that "we do not wish to sanction the torture [the tyranny of consciences] of the Summists, which notwithstanding would have been less intolerable if they had added one word concerning faith, which comforts and encourages consciences. Now, concerning this faith, which obtains the remission of sins, there is not a syllable in so great a mass of regulations, glosses, summaries, books of confession. Christ is nowhere read there".

Martin Luther on Confession
In his 1529 catechisms, Martin Luther praised confession (before a pastor or a fellow Christian) "for the sake of absolution", the forgiveness of sins bestowed in an audible, concrete way. The Lutheran reformers held that a complete enumeration of sins is impossible and that one's confidence of forgiveness is not to be based on the sincerity of one's contrition nor on one's doing works of satisfaction imposed by the confessor (penance). The Roman Catholic church held confession to be composed of three parts: contritio cordis ("contrition of the heart"), confessio oris ("confession of the mouth"), and satisfactio operis ("satisfaction of deeds"). The Lutheran reformers abolished the "satisfaction of deeds," holding that confession and absolution consist of only two parts: the confession of the penitent and the absolution spoken by the confessor. Faith or trust in Jesus' complete active and passive satisfaction is what receives the forgiveness and salvation won by him and imparted to the penitent by the word of absolution.

Form of Confession 

Lutheran confession (in the same manner as confession in the Catholic Church) can be done in the church chancel with the penitent kneeling at the altar rail and the pastor sitting in front of them, in the privacy of the pastor's office, or sometimes in a confessional. The words below, taken from the Lutheran Service Book and used in most confessions, say:

The penitent begins by saying:

Here, the penitent is to confess whatever they have done against the commandments of God, according to their own place in life. The penitent continues.

The pastor continues:

The penitent will say:

The pastor places his hand on the head of the penitent and says the following:

The pastor dismisses the penitent.

The penitent responds:

Another suggested form for Confession was outlined by Luther himself in the Small Cathechism of 1529 (Part V. HOW THE UNLEARNED SHOULD BE TAUGHT TO CONFESS):

You speak unto the confessor thus:

Proceed!

A master or mistress may say thus:

And whatever else he has done against God's command and his station, etc.  But if any one does not find himself burdened with such or greater sins, he should not trouble himself or search for or invent other sins, and thereby make confession a torture, but mention one or two that he knows.  Thus:

Let this suffice.  But if you know of none at all (which, however, is scarcely possible), then mention none in particular, but receive the forgiveness upon the general confession which you make before God to the confessor.

Then shall the confessor say:

Furthermore:

Answer:

Then let him say:

But those who have great burdens upon their consciences, or are distressed and tempted, the confessor will know how to comfort and to encourage to faith with more passages of Scripture.  This is to be merely a general form of confession for the unlearned.

References 

 
Martin Luther
Sacraments
Lutheran sacraments and rites